2010 Bamberg Super Cup was a mini-tournament held between 4 European national basketball teams in preparation for the 2010 FIBA World Championship. The tournament was held from August 13 until August 15 in Bamberg, Germany. Lithuania won the tournament with a 3–0 record.

Participants 
  - host nation

Standings 

|}

Results 

2010 FIBA World Championship
International basketball competitions hosted by Germany
2010–11 in German basketball
2010–11 in Croatian basketball
2010–11 in Turkish basketball
2010–11 in Lithuanian basketball